Back in the Saddle is the fifth and final studio album by American country music artist Chris Cagle. It was released on June 26, 2012 as his only studio album via Bigger Picture Music Group. It includes the Top 15 single "Got My Country On."

Track listing

Personnel
Robert Bailey Jr.- background vocals
Tom Bukovac- electric guitar
Chris Cagle- lead vocals
Chad Cromwell- drums
Dan Dugmore- dobro, electric guitar, steel guitar, lap steel guitar
Stuart Duncan- fiddle, acoustic guitar, resonator guitar
Shannon Forrest- drums
Paul Franklin- steel guitar
Vicki Hampton- background vocals
Wes Hightower- background vocals
Andy Leftwich- fiddle, mandolin
Paul Leim- drums
Brent Mason- electric guitar
Gary Prim- Hammond B-3 organ, piano, Wurlitzer
John Wesley Ryles- background vocals
Jimmie Lee Sloas- bass guitar
Bobby Terry- acoustic guitar, electric guitar, resonator guitar
D. Vincent Williams- background vocals
Glenn Worf- bass guitar

Charts

Weekly charts

Year-end charts

References

2012 albums
Chris Cagle albums
Bigger Picture Music Group albums
Albums produced by Keith Stegall